"Albatross" is the lead single and title track from Big Wreck's 2012 album, Albatross. It is Big Wreck's first single released after reuniting in 2010 and their first single release since 2002. A 16-second preview clip of the song was released on October 24, 2011. The song was first streamed in its entirety on the Thornley/Big Wreck website on November 17, 2011, and was officially released digitally on November 21. The song held the No. 1 position on the Billboard Canadian Rock chart for six weeks straight. In 2012, the song won the CASBY Award for "Favourite New Single".

Charts

References

2011 singles
Songs written by Ian Thornley
2011 songs